Kevin Edward Trenberth (born 8 November 1944) is part of the Climate Analysis Section at the US NCAR National Center for Atmospheric Research. He was a lead author of the 2001 and 2007 IPCC Scientific Assessment of Climate Change (see IPCC Fourth Assessment Report) and serves on the Scientific Steering Group for the Climate Variability and Predictability (CLIVAR) program.  He chaired the WCRP Observation and Assimilation Panel from 2004 to 2010 and chaired the Global Energy and Water Exchanges (GEWEX) scientific steering group from 2010 to 2013 (member 2007-14). In addition, he served on the Joint Scientific Committee of the World Climate Research Programme, and has made significant contributions to research into El Niño-Southern Oscillation.

Trenberth's work is highly cited and he has an h-index of 100 (100 papers have over 100 citations).

Awards
Trenberth is a fellow of the American Meteorological Society (AMS), the American Association for Advancement of Science, and the American Geophysical Union; and an honorary fellow of the Royal Society of New Zealand. In 2000 he received the Jule G. Charney award from the American Meteorological Society; in 2003 he was given the NCAR Distinguished Achievement Award; and in 2013 he was awarded the Prince Sultan Bin Abdulaziz International Prize for Water, and the Climate Communication Prize from American Geophysical Union.

Short term climate variability
In a 2009 paper, "An imperative for climate change planning: tracking Earth's global energy", Trenberth discussed the distribution of heat and how it was affected by climate forcing, including greenhouse gas changes. This could be tracked from 1993 to 2003, but for the period from 2004 to 2008 it was not then possible to explain the relatively cool temperatures of 2008.

In the Climatic Research Unit email controversy, an unlawfully disclosed email from Trenberth about this paper was widely misrepresented; he wrote, "The fact is that we can't account for the lack of warming at the moment and it is a travesty that we can't." Trenberth has stated: "It is amazing to see this particular quote lambasted so often. It stems from a paper I published this year bemoaning our inability to effectively monitor the energy flows associated with short-term climate variability. It is quite clear from the paper that I was not questioning the link between anthropogenic greenhouse gas emissions and warming, or even suggesting that recent temperatures are unusual in the context of short-term natural variability."

In a 2013 scientific paper in Geophysical Research Letters, Trenberth and co-authors presented an observation-based reanalysis of global ocean temperatures. This proposed that a recent hiatus in upper-ocean warming after 2004 had seen the long-term increase interrupted by sharp cooling events due to volcanic eruptions and El Niño. Despite this, ocean warming had continued below the 700m depth.

In a second 2013 paper, Trenberth and Fasullo discussed the effect of the 1999 change from a positive to negative phase of the Pacific Decadal Oscillation. This was associated with a change of surface winds over the Pacific which had caused ocean heat to penetrate below 700m depth and had contributed to the apparent global warming hiatus in surface temperatures during the previous decade.

In an interview, Trenberth said, "The planet is warming", but "the warmth just isn't being manifested at the surface." He said his research showed that there had been a significant increase in deep ocean absorption of heat, particularly after 1998. He told Nature that "The 1997 to '98 El Niño event was a trigger for the changes in the Pacific, and I think that's very probably the beginning of the hiatus". He said that, eventually, "it will switch back in the other direction."
Trenberth's explanation attracted wide attention in the press.

Trenberth received the 2017 Roger Revelle Medal from the American Geophysical Union for his work on climate change issues.

Publications

Books

 2022 : The Changing Flow of Energy Through the Climate System Cambridge University Press 
 2000 : (in collaboration with K. A. Miller, L. O. Mearns and S. Rhodes) "Effects of Changing Climate on Weather and Human Activities" University Science Books / University Corporation for Atmospheric Research (UCAR) 
 1993 : (editor) Climate System Modelling Cambridge University Press

See also 
Effects of climate change
Loop Current

References

External links
Kevin E. Trenberth at the University Corporation for Atmospheric Research 
"How to Fix the Climate-Change Panel", Questions for climate modeller and IPCC insider Kevin E. Trenberth, IEEE Spectrum, Oct. 2010.
"Check With Climate Scientists for Views on Climate", by Trenberth and 37 co-signers, Wall Street Journal, 1 February 2012
Reply to Trenberth et al. by Claude Allegre et al., WSJ, 21 February 2012

Living people
New Zealand climatologists
Intergovernmental Panel on Climate Change lead authors
American people of New Zealand descent
Fellows of the Royal Society of New Zealand
1944 births
Massachusetts Institute of Technology alumni
People from Christchurch
National Center for Atmospheric Research faculty
Fellows of the American Meteorological Society
Climate communication